Chungwoon University is a private university in western South Korea.  The campus is located in Hongseong County in South Chungcheong province.  The current president is Kim Hui-jung (김희중).

Academics

Undergraduate offerings are divided among the divisions of Humanities, Technology, and Arts.

History

The university first opened in 1993.  The graduate school was opened in 1997.

Sister schools
Ties exist with schools in China, Vietnam and the United States.

Notable alumni
So Ji-sub, model and actor
Choi Daniel, actor
Leeteuk, singer and actor (Super Junior)
Kim Hee-chul, presenter, singer and actor (Super Junior)
Yesung, singer and actor (Super Junior)
Shindong, singer and actor (Super Junior)
Eunhyuk, singer and actor (Super Junior)
Donghae, singer and actor (Super Junior)
Yunho, singer (TVXQ)
Onew, singer, actor (Shinee)
Kim Jong-hyun, singer, composer, presenter and producer (Shinee)

See also
List of colleges and universities in South Korea
Education in South Korea

External links
Official school website, in English and Korean

Universities and colleges in South Chungcheong Province
Hongseong County
Educational institutions established in 1993
1993 establishments in South Korea